Zeta Makripoulia (Greek: Ζέτα Μακρυπούλια; born 31 July 1978) is a Greek actress, TV hostess and former model.

Career
Makripoulia graduated from Vasilis Diamantopoulos' Drama School in 1994, while she has also attended acting classes at Theatro ton Allagon. Then she started appearing on television and has participated in various shows and commercials for the last years. She also has worked in various television productions. Makripoulia appeared in the hit series Para Pente, with her performance as a naive village girl in the series. Zeta and actor/scriptwriter Giorgos Kapoutzidis were commentators of the 51st Eurovision Song Contest in Athens.
Aside from television productions Zeta has also appeared on stage, debuting for the first time in 2005 in the theatrical play "Sesouar gia Dolofonous". For the past years, she has also been working as a radio DJ for well-known radio stations, including Ciao FM and Sfera 102.2. In 2010 she starred in Wog Boy 2: Kings of Mykonos alongside Nick Giannopoulos and Vince Colosimo as Zoe, the love interest of Giannopoulos' character. From 2010 to 2012 she presented the Greek version of Dancing with the Stars.

Personal life

Origin
Makripoulia's origin is from village Potamoula, Aetolia-Acarnania.

Family
Makripoulia has two brothers Panagiotis and Akis.

Relationships
From 1994 to 1997, Makripoulia had been in a relationship with gymnast Kostas Alibertis.

From March 1999 to September 2007, Makripoulia had been in a relationship with Greek singer Antonis Remos.

From June 2010 to February 2021, Makripoulia had been in a relationship with Cypriot singer-songwriter Michalis Hatzigiannis. They met at Mad VMA 2010.

Filmography

Film

Television

Theatre
2004 – 2006: Sesouar Gia Dolofonous
2006 – 2007: S' Agapo, Se Latrevo, Horizoume
2007: Mideia
2007 – 2008: T' Oneiro Tis Diplanis Portas
2008 – 2009: Stis kouzines
2009 – 2010: Ena Paidi Metraei T' Astra
2010 – 2011: Tiflosourtis
2012 – 2013: Ta Vaftisia
2013 – 2014: Sugar – Merikoi To Protimoun Kauto
2015: Irthes Kai Tha Meineis

References

External links
 

1978 births
Living people
Actresses from Athens
Greek television actresses
Greek stage actresses
Greek female models
Greek women television presenters